Holopterygius is an extinct genus of prehistoric eel-like coelacanth. Despite its specialized morphology and superficial dissimilarity to the usual coelacanth body plan, it is one of the most basal actinistian fish.

See also

 Prehistoric fish
 List of prehistoric bony fish

References

External links
 Bony fish in the online Sepkoski Database

Prehistoric lobe-finned fish genera
Hadronectoridae